Riot! is the second studio album by American rock band Paramore. It was released in the United States on June 12, 2007, through Fueled by Ramen as a follow-up to their debut album, All We Know Is Falling (2005). The album was produced by David Bendeth and written by band members Hayley Williams and Josh Farro, with Bendeth, and fellow member Zac Farro co-writing on select tracks. The album is said to explore a "diverse range of styles," while not straying far from the "signature sound" of their debut album,  with several critics comparing it to the likes of Kelly Clarkson and Avril Lavigne. The cover of the album also resembles the cover artwork of No Doubt's Rock Steady.

Riot! received generally positive reviews from music critics, who praised its sound, and noted its "crossover potential". The album was successful in the United States, reaching number fifteen on the Billboard 200 and achieving triple-platinum status on April 20, 2021, by the Recording Industry Association of America (RIAA). It was also certified platinum in the United Kingdom by the British Phonographic Industry, and gold in Australia, New Zealand, and Canada. The lead single, "Misery Business", reached top-thirty and forty positions in the US and is considered the band's "breakthrough" hit; credited with introducing the band to a mainstream audience. The third and fourth singles, "Crushcrushcrush", and "That's What You Get", were also successful with both achieving a platinum certification by the RIAA.

Background and recording
Before work began on Paramore's next album, bassist Jeremy Davis was expelled from the band due to "his lack of work ethic and participation in things that [the rest of the band] didn't agree with," according to guitarist Josh Farro. Following his departure, Farro and his brother, drummer Zac Farro, convinced lead vocalist Hayley Williams to bring Taylor York as guitarist, although Williams insisted on Davis' reinstatement in the band. After an agreement involving the remaining three members, Davis was reinstated as bassist, and York became the band's touring guitarist only. York had been in a band with the Farro brothers before the two met Williams.

Williams explained the album was titled Riot! because during the writing process their "thoughts and emotions were coming out so fast that we couldn't control them," comparing it to a riot. Williams also commented on the band's evolution with the album stating, "I think our intention for [All We Know Is Falling] would have been for it to be everything that Riot! is, but there wasn't any time to make that record back then." After being courted by producers Neal Avron and Howard Benson, Paramore opted to record the album with producer David Bendeth in New Jersey, who had previously worked with Your Vegas and Breaking Benjamin. 

The album was recorded from January to April 2007 at the House of Loud and Bennett Studios, the former was also the mixing location, while the latter was the recording place for the piano arrangements; it was produced and mixed by David Bendeth, and mastered by Ted Jensen at Sterling Sound Studios. During production, Paramore held an online contest, titled "The Last Song You'll Ever Sing", where fans submitted videos on YouTube for the opportunity to sing back-up vocals on the track "Born for This". The winner was Mary Bonney of McLean, Virginia.

Music and style
Williams classified Riot! as "raw energy," which she considered development of their debut album. The first track "For a Pessimist I'm Pretty Optimistic" comes from what lead guitarist Josh Farro reflects as "putting your faith in someone and they blow it." Farro composed the music for the song and gave the demo to Williams to write the lyrics. The origins of "Misery Business" came from a message Williams posted on the band's LiveJournal, asking fans to post about what they were ashamed of. She found out that most of them "were reaching out to someone to spill their guts to," which she recalled being an inspiration for the honest songwriting of the song.

Williams recounted that "Hallelujah" is one of the band's oldest songs, but they felt it fit better in Riot!. She described the song as "a claim of victory for both ourselves and our fans." The eleventh track "Born for This" contains the line "we want the airwaves back", from the song "Liberation Frequency" in the album The Shape of Punk to Come by the influential Swedish hardcore band Refused. Williams has explained that this song was written "about the fans" and "that the whole pre-chorus is actually inspired by that one line of the song."

Ian Cohen of MTV Hive described the album as "classic alt-rock with a distinctly Fueled By Ramen edge." Cam Lindsay at Exclaim! characterized it as "high-energy/high-emotion pop punk," while AllMusic's Jason Lymangrover states "[Williams] fills the majority of her punk-pop tales with emo angst and declarations of boy woes." It is also declared as one of 2007's most popular emo pop albums by Andrew Leahey of AllMusic. Jonathan Bradley at Stylus Magazine labeled it as "irrepressible power pop". Alternative Press wrote "Paramore...have created 11 more-than-competent pop-rock numbers."

Release and promotion

On March 13, 2007, it was announced that guitarist Hunter Lamb left the group to focus on family. On April 13, "Misery Business" was made available for streaming. A week later, the album's cover art and track listing was revealed. In April and May, the band went on headlining tour of the U.S. They were supported by the Almost, This Providence, Love Arcade and Quietdrive. Riot! was released through Fueled by Ramen on June 12, following the debut of "Misery Business" on the radio. From late June to late August, the band went on the 2007 edition of Warped Tour. In October and November, the group went on a co-headlining US tour with the Starting Line. Set Your Goals opened the first half of the tour, while the Almost opened the second half. The album was re-released in late 2007 as a MVI CD/DVD, which includes the ability to remix Crushcrushcrush and Misery Business using the program U-MYX and includes music videos as well as live videos, lyrics and digital liner notes. The album has yielded four singles, with "Misery Business" being the first. The album's second single was "Hallelujah". The album's third single was "Crushcrushcrush", released on January 15, 2008, in the US and January 23 in the UK.

The album's fourth single, "That's What You Get", was released just over a week after Paramore cancelled their European tour to work on "personal issues", amidst media speculation of the band breaking up. For the single's video shoot, Williams explained that, given the fragile state of the band, they all thought it best if they kept things low-key, surrounding themselves with their friends and family and keeping it simple. Williams added, "We had tons of friends there, and it really just felt like a hangout session. And Marcos [Siega, the director] was so cool about it. He said, 'Bring your friends.' We shot it in some of our friends' houses, and it just felt so real... and I think it's the first time in a video you're gonna get to see who we really are." Williams had stated "We're hoping to do one more tour across the States before we really get started with all the (European summer) festivals. Of course, I want to do more Warped Tour dates, 'cause it's, like, my favorite tour ever. We'll see what works out and hopefully just have another great year." In early April, the band appeared at the Bamboozle Left festival. In April and May, the band went on a co-headlining US tour with Jimmy Eat World. In July, the band performed on the 2008 edition of Warped Tour for a week. In July and August, the band went on a US tour with Jack's Mannequin, Paper Route and Phantom Planet.

Critical reception

Riot! received generally positive reviews from music critics. According to Metacritic, the album holds a score of 67 out of 100, indicating "generally favorable reviews" based on 8 reviews. Jason Lymangrover of AllMusic stated "Filled with crossover potential, the songs are consistent and zippy with catchy hooks in the vein of Boys Like Girls fronted by a young Shirley Manson." At Stylus Magazine, Jonathan Bradley opined that "Riot! is immediately appealing because it focuses on sounds that have been neglected by the genre's front-runners. This is an uncomplicated album of strikingly uncomplicated music, entirely lacking in 15 word song titles." Bradley also compared it to the "better songs" from Kelly Clarkson and Avril Lavigne. Gareth Dobson at Drowned in Sound observed "At 38 minutes long, it's mercifully brief, but still manages to feel like a double album for those who endure it. That is, those who don't manage to forget that it's on the stereo at all. People, get your pop-punk thrills somewhere else. At least somewhere where there are actual thrills to be had."

IGN's Ed Thompson stated "This is by no means a must have album and is not going to be remembered as the band's defining moment by any stretch of the imagination. But what Riot! will do is serve as a foundation from which the kids can continue to learn, grow and improve." Thompson also commented that it shows more maturity compared to similar bands. Lewis P. at Sputnikmusic described it as the best pop punk album of 2007, commenting "Paramore might not be tapping into anything new, but it has finally hit its stride, making pop-punk anthems that match the praise." Alternative Press writer Scott Heisel commented "considering the median age of the band, the musicianship shown on Riot! is mightily impressive...while the record as a whole may not be a home run, it’s solid stand-up double that keeps Fueled By Ramen’s inning alive for their next clean-up hitter." Justin Mabee at Jesus Freak Hideout declared "While this new album may lack some of the spiritual depth that rocked their debut, the whole record retains a very positive feeling to it" Mabee commented that the band "has come a long way" with the album since they have formed.

Accolades
The album was included in Rock Sounds 101 Modern Classics list at number 10. The album was included at number 16 on Rock Sounds "The 51 Most Essential Pop Punk Albums of All Time" list. Stylus Magazine listed it at number 49 in their top 50 albums of 2007. In 2023, the album was included at number 26 on Loudwires "100 Best Rock And Metal Albums Of The 21st Century" list.

Commercial performance
Riot! entered the U.S. Billboard 200 albums chart at 20 in late 2007. Riot! sold 42,000 albums in the U.S. in its first week and three months later the album hit its peak at 15 on the Billboard 200. The album was certified triple-Platinum on April 20, 2021. The album achieved some success in the UK reaching #24 on the albums chart sales and selling 250,094 copies to date. In New Zealand, the album peaked at number 15, and was certified Gold on February 1, 2009, shipping over  15,000 copies. "Misery Business" became a hit, spending 22 weeks at #3 on Alternative Songs chart. The song has been certified quadruple-Platinum by the RIAA.

Track listing
All tracks are written by Josh Farro and Hayley Williams, except where noted. All tracks produced by David Bendeth.

Personnel

Paramore
Hayley Williams – lead vocals
Josh Farro – guitar, background vocals 
Jeremy Davis – bass, background vocals 
Zac Farro – drums, background vocals 

Additional musicians
Sebastian Davin – piano 
Taylor Robinson – backing vocals
Kathleen Smith – backing vocals
Brian Weaver – bass 
Boots – additional drums and keys programming 
John Freund – Hammond organ 

Artwork
Mark Obriski – art direction and album design
Josh Rothstein – photography

Production
John Bender – arranger, digital editing, engineer, strings, vocal producer, backing vocals (on "Hallelujah")
David Bendeth – producer, mixer, writer, arranger
Dan Korneff – digital editing, engineer
Tim Flanzbaum – assistant engineer, digital editing
Kato Khandwala – audio engineer
Ted Jensen – mastering at Sterling Sound Studios
Isaiah Abolin – assistant mixing engineer

Management
Mark Mercado and Dave Steunebrink – management
Jason Childress Business Management at Curo Financial Management LLC
Ken Fermaglich and David Gelea – booking agents for The Agency Group
Steve Robertson – A&R
Anne DeClemente – A&R administration
Denise Stevens – legal counsel for Loeb & Loeb Nashville
David Burrier – marketing and product development

Charts

Weekly charts

Year-end charts

Certifications

Notes

References
Citations

Sources

External links

Riot! at YouTube (streamed copy where licensed)

2007 albums
Albums produced by David Bendeth
Paramore albums
Fueled by Ramen albums